Music and Lyrics is a 2007 American musical romantic comedy-drama film written and directed by Marc Lawrence. It focuses on the relationship that evolves between a former pop music idol (of the fictional band PoP!) and an aspiring writer as they struggle to compose a song for a reigning pop diva.

The film was released on February 14, 2007, by Warner Bros. It received mixed to positive reviews from critics, who praised Grant's performance and the musical numbers but found the film simplistic, and grossed $145 million worldwide.

Plot
Alex Fletcher is a washed-up former pop star (from the British group 'PoP!') who seems happy in his "has-been" status, performing for 80s-loving fans at reunions and random locations, when his manager tells him Cora Corman, a young megastar, wants him to write a song for her, titled "A Way Back Into Love". Alex is reluctant to compose again after two decades, because his strength was always the tune while his ex-partner Colin always wrote the words. However, his caring but professional manager tells him that his music career is completely doomed if he doesn't switch gears—interest in his nostalgia concerts is dwindling.

During an unsuccessful attempt to compose the song in collaboration with a "very hip, very edgy" lyricist, Alex discovers that the woman who is temporarily watering his plants, Sophie Fisher, has a talent for writing lyrics. Alex, on a 48-hour deadline to write the song, asks her to help him, but she refuses multiple times, to the chagrin of her older sister Rhonda, who happens to be a huge fan of Alex. It's not until Alex composes a lovely song with some of Sophie's lyrics and plays it for her that she realizes they could do it. Over the next few days, they grow closer while writing the words and music together. Sophie reveals she lost confidence in herself and abandoned writing after a disastrous romance with her English professor Sloan Cates.

Barely meeting the deadline Cora has set for the song's delivery, Alex and Sophie are thrilled when she accepts it; however, at a celebratory dinner with Alex's manager Chris and his wife, Sophie is mortified to encounter Sloan. She confronts him but finds herself tongue-tied in his presence, and Alex's own attempts to defend her result in a scuffle. Nursing their wounds back at Alex's apartment, Alex and Sophie fall into an unplanned romantic encounter.

When Cora invites Alex and Sophie to hear her interpretation of "A Way Back into Love," Sophie is horrified by her Indian-vibed, sexually confident interpretation of their earnest song. Alex rushes Sophie out of the room before she can say anything, and tells her he agrees it's awful but says they need to accept it as the cost of doing business. Later at Cora's party, despite Alex's best efforts to block her, Sophie finally tells Cora that she feels the new arrangement clashes with the insecurity expressed in the song's lyrics. Cora says she's still going to perform it her way, but expresses appreciation for Sophie's honesty. Sophie leaves Alex when she gets upset by his willingness to demean his talent and his claim that Sloan was right about her personality.

Sophie, intending to start a new life in Florida, reluctantly attends the opening of Cora's new tour at Madison Square Garden, at which Alex and Cora will debut "Way Back Into Love". Upon hearing that Alex is singing a new song "written by Alex Fletcher", Sophie, believing that Alex is stealing credit for her work; attempts to leave; but however, the song Alex sings is called "Don't Write Me Off", his plea for Sophie to give him another chance. A touched Sophie finds Alex backstage and he confesses to having successfully convinced Cora to drop the risqué version of "A Way Back into Love" in an attempt to win Sophie back. He and Cora perform the tune as he and Sophie intended it to be sung.

The end of the movie (an homage to VH1's Pop-Up Video) reveals that the song becomes a hit for Cora and Alex, the film version of Sloan's novel flops with critics and moviegoers (destroying his career), PoP! reunites for their induction into the Rock and Roll Hall of Fame, after which their lead singer Colin Thompson (who left the band with some of Alex's songs to start a solo career) winds up having his hip replaced after years of dancing, and Alex and Sophie go on to become successful partners, both in songwriting and romance, with five more new pop hits.

Cast
Hugh Grant as Alex Fletcher, a New York-based former pop music idol and member of the British band "Pop!" (inspired by Wham! and Duran Duran) who attempts to launch his comeback by writing a new song for a rising diva.
Drew Barrymore as Sophie Fisher
Brad Garrett as Chris Riley, Alex's manager
Kristen Johnston as Rhonda Fisher, Sophie's sister
Haley Bennett as Cora Corman, a rising pop diva who commissions Alex Fletcher to write a song for her.
Campbell Scott as Sloan Cates
Scott Porter as Colin Thompson
Matthew Morrison as Ray, Cora's manager
Zak Orth as David Newbert
Aasif Mandvi as Khan, the manager of Alex's apartment
Jason Antoon as Greg Antonsky
Adam Grupper as Gary, Sophie's brother-in-law

Reception

Critical response
On Rotten Tomatoes, the film holds an approval rating of 63% based on 169 reviews, with an average rating of 6/10. The site's critical consensus reads, "Music & Lyrics is a light and pleasant romantic comedy that succeeds because of the considerable charm of its co-stars. The music segments featuring Hugh Grant are worth the price of admission." On Metacritic the film has a weighted average score of 59 out of 100, based on 30 critics, indicating "mixed or average reviews". Audiences polled by CinemaScore gave the film an average grade of "B" on an A+ to F scale.

A.O. Scott of The New York Times called the film "the type of modern Hollywood production that aspires to nothing more than the competent dispensing of mild amusement and easy emotion. The writer and director, Marc Lawrence ... shows some imagination as he parodies the music-video styles of various eras, and he contrives a bit of novelty in making the movie's central couple creative partners as well as potential lovers ... Mr. Grant is at his best when he allows a hard glint of caddish narcissism to peek through his easy flirtatiousness, something he did in About a Boy and American Dreamz. There is not quite enough of that here, nor enough of the anarchic loopiness that Ms. Barrymore brought to roles opposite Adam Sandler in The Wedding Singer and 50 First Dates."

Mick LaSalle of the San Francisco Chronicle observed, "Writer-director Marc Lawrence makes a talk-heavy variety of romantic comedy that not everyone likes - Miss Congeniality, Two Weeks Notice, Forces of Nature - but he does it well. Moreover, Music and Lyrics has virtues its predecessors lack. Scenes play out longer than in most films, and conversations have a chance to evolve. Also, because much of the film places the protagonists in rooms together, working for extended periods, there are an unusual number of two-person scenes, giving the actors the chance to show their charm, work off each other and develop the nuances of interaction ... Lawrence's take on pop music success is exactly right, satiric without being absurdist, and therefore a prize worth the effort."

Todd McCarthy of Variety said "Sitcommy in structure and execution, this very mainstream romance ... offers few surprises. But its pep, agreeable performances and appealing central conceit will profitably put this Warner Bros. Valentine's Day romantic comedy over with women and couples seeking a nice diversion ... Writer-director Marc Lawrence ... makes everything about three times more obvious than it needs to be; as a director, he needs to edit himself better as a writer ... But there's energy here, and the actors feed on it."

Peter Bradshaw of The Guardian rated the film two out of five stars, calling it a "very moderate romcom" and adding, "Grant and Barrymore make a reasonable odd couple, and both have charm, but this never comes to life."

Philip French of The Observer said, "Grant has the occasional good line (or at least he makes a few of them seem funny), but the film limps along like someone trying to tap dance in flippers."

Box office
The film opened on February 9, 2007 in the United Kingdom and Ireland and ranked #1 at the box office, grossing £1.93 million in its first weekend. It was released on 2,955 screens in the United States and Canada on February 14 and grossed $13,623,630 on its opening weekend, ranking #4 at the box office behind Ghost Rider, Bridge to Terabithia, and Norbit. It eventually grossed $50,572,589 in the US and Canada and $95,323,833 in foreign markets for a total worldwide box office of $145,896,422.

Soundtrack

The soundtrack album with several songs performed by Grant reached #5 on the Billboard Top Soundtracks Chart and #63 on the Billboard 200.
Martin Fry of pop band ABC served as Grant's vocal coach for the movie. The album also reached #93 on the Australian Albums Chart.

Home media

The film was released on DVD, HD-DVD and Blu-ray on May 8, 2007.

References

External links

2007 romantic comedy films
2007 films
American musical comedy films
American romantic comedy films
Castle Rock Entertainment films
Films about music and musicians
Films directed by Marc Lawrence
Films with screenplays by Marc Lawrence
Films set in New York City
Village Roadshow Pictures films
Warner Bros. films
2000s English-language films
2000s American films